everGirl was a product brand belonging to Nickelodeon and Viacom aimed at children and introduced in 2004. It was described as "a lifestyle brand specifically created for tween girls". The products include dolls, clothes, compact discs, digital cameras, video games and a virtual community. The site has been on indefinite hiatus – "getting a makeover" – since 2006, and now redirects to Nick.com. The band Play made the site's theme song and they were also sponsors. However, they have since broken up. It may be possible that the brand is now discontinued partly due to the disbandment of Play. In 2009, Play returned, but they were not involved in everGirl anymore. A TV series based on the brand was supposed to be air on Nickelodeon, but it was never produced.

External links

References

Paramount Global
Nickelodeon
Game Boy Advance games
Windows games